Unknown Origins is a 2020 Spanish thriller film directed by , written by David Galán Galindo and Fernando Navarro, based on Galindo's novel of the same name, and starring Javier Rey, Verónica Echegui and Brays Efe alongside Antonio Resines.

Plot 
Set in Madrid in 2019, the plot sees a psychotic character using comics and superheroes' origin stories to kill people and leaves a mark. One man is killed after being fed enough supplements and steroids to be the Hulk. Another has his heart plucked out and is covered in a metallic suit.

Attempting to stop this is Inspector David, a man who feels comics are for overgrown adults and quickly pays the price for that sort of criticism. Initially, he is assisted by Cosme, a cop on spending his final days on the force after being forced to turn in his resignation. David's boss is the homicide chief (Norma), who loves cosplaying. In her words, she doesn't read comics, rather she watches movies and anime.

Joining the duo is Jorge Elías, Cosme's son. He is a comic geek and runs a comic book store in the city. When Cosme realizes the demented villain commits murders in the form of creating superhero origin stories, he feels Jorge is better suited to work the case with David.

Things escalate when David realizes his parents were killed the same way as Martha and Thomas Wayne were killed in the comics. Jorge, David, and Norma go up against a secret killer who is ahead of them the whole time. With time running out for the trio to find the killer, they face pressure as the news go public. Bruguera, the forensic man in the department, is eventually revealed to be the killer and the rest of the story follows the trio attempting to put an end to his nefarious plans.

Cast

Release 
The film was scheduled to show at the 2020 Málaga Film Festival, but filmmakers pulled it from the schedule when the festival dates changed from March to August. It was released on August 28, 2020 on Netflix.

Accolades 

|-
| align = "center" rowspan = "4" | 2021 || 8th Feroz Awards || colspan = "2" | Best Comedy Film ||  || align = "center" | 
|-
| rowspan = "3" | 35th Goya Awards || Best Adapted Screenplay || David Galán Galindo, Fernando Navarro ||  || rowspan = "3" | 
|-
| Best Makeup and Hairstyles || Paula Cruz, Jesús Guerra, Nacho Díaz || 
|-
| Best Special Effects || Lluis Rivera Jove, Helmuth Barnert || 
|}

See also 
 List of Spanish films of 2020

References

External links
 
 
 

2020 films
Spanish-language Netflix original films
2020 crime thriller films
Films set in 2019
Films set in Madrid
2020s mystery thriller films
2020s Spanish-language films
Spanish mystery thriller films
Spanish crime thriller films
Films about comics
Films based on Spanish novels
2020s Spanish films